PAAC may be an initialism for:

 Port Authority of Allegheny County, the former name of Pittsburgh Regional Transit
 Philippine Army Air Corps, the predecessor of the Philippine Air Force